Matilda of Amboise (Mahaut, Mathilde d'Amboise; c. 1200 ‒ 12 May 1256) was the Countess of Chartres 1248-1256. She was the daughter of Sulpice III of Amboise and Isabella of Blois.

She married Richard II, Vicomte de Beaumont, but it seems they were childless. Richard died on 17 September 1242. In 1232 Matilda and Richard gave land to the nuns of Lieu. Matilda later married Jean II de Nesle. She was also childless with him.

On Matilda’s death, her cousin John I, Count of Blois reunited Chartres with Blois.

References

Sources

144

1200s births
1256 deaths
13th-century French women
13th-century French nobility
13th-century women rulers